Jandaq (also Romanized as Jondaq; also known as Djandak and Jandak)  is a city in Khur and Biabanak County, Isfahan Province, Iran.  At the 2006 census, its population was 3,958, in 1,162 families.

The monuments of Jandaq include Jandaq Castle (or Fortress of Ardbil), which seems to date back to the Sasanian Empire, and which is known as the prison of Khosrow Anushirvān.

References

Populated places in Khur and Biabanak County

Cities in Isfahan Province